Ken Flach and Robert Seguso defeated the defending champions Jeremy Bates and Anders Järryd in the final, 7–6(7–1), 6–7(5–7), [10–7] to win the senior gentlemen's invitation doubles tennis title at the 2008 Wimbledon Championships.

Draw

Final

Group A
Standings are determined by: 1. number of wins; 2. number of matches; 3. in two-players-ties, head-to-head records; 4. in three-players-ties, percentage of sets won, or of games won; 5. steering-committee decision.

Group B
Standings are determined by: 1. number of wins; 2. number of matches; 3. in two-players-ties, head-to-head records; 4. in three-players-ties, percentage of sets won, or of games won; 5. steering-committee decision.

External links
Draw

Men's Invitation Doubles, Senior